Greensboro is a town located on the banks of the Choptank River in Caroline County, Maryland, United States. The population was 1,931 at the 2010 United States Census. The ZIP code is 21639. The primary phone exchange is 482 and the area code is 410.  The town is served by Maryland Routes 480 and 313.

Greensboro hosted the Caroline County Softball League, which produced both state and national champions.

Willow Grove was listed on the National Register of Historic Places in 1972.  Leonard House was listed in 1988 and Brick House Farm in 2009.

Geography

Demographics

2010 census
As of the census of 2010, there were 1,931 people, 703 households, and 477 families living in the town. The racial makeup of the town was 75.8% White, 13.6% African American, 0.9% Native American, 0.8% Asian, 1.4% Pacific Islander, 4.0% from other races, and 3.6% from two or more races. Hispanic or Latino of any race were 9.4% of the population.

There were 703 households, of which 42.4% had children under the age of 18 living with them, 42.0% were married couples living together, 18.3% had a female householder with no husband present, 7.5% had a male householder with no wife present, and 32.1% were non-families. 27.3% of all households were made up of individuals, and 12.4% had someone living alone who was 65 years of age or older. The average household size was 2.74 and the average family size was 3.30.

The median age in the town was 30.2 years. 30% of residents were under the age of 18; 10.5% were between the ages of 18 and 24; 30.2% were from 25 to 44; 19.5% were from 45 to 64; and 9.8% were 65 years of age or older. The gender makeup of the town was 46.5% male and 53.5% female.

2000 census
As of the census of 2000, there were 1,632 people, 616 households, and 407 families living in the town. The racial makeup of the town was 78.86% White, 16.91% African American, 0.06% Native American, 0.67% Asian, 1.78% from other races, and 1.72% from two or more races. Hispanic or Latino of any race were 2.63% of the population.

There were 616 households, out of which 40.6% had children under the age of 18 living with them, 41.7% were married couples living together, 19.6% had a female householder with no husband present, and 33.9% were non-families. 29.1% of all households were made up of individuals, and 13.6% had someone living alone who was 65 years of age or older. The average household size was 2.64 and the average family size was 3.28.

In the town, the population was spread out, with 32.4% under the age of 18, 9.4% from 18 to 24, 29.4% from 25 to 44, 16.5% from 45 to 64, and 12.3% who were 65 years of age or older. The median age was 31 years. For every 100 females, there were 85.0 males. For every 100 females age 18 and over, there were 80.8 males.

The median income for a household in the town was $31,397, and the median income for a family was $36,083. Males had a median income of $27,092 versus $20,729 for females. The per capita income for the town was $13,787. About 15.6% of families and 16.5% of the population were below the poverty line, including 21.6% of those under age 18 and 17.1% of those age 65 or over.

Communities
 Maple Village
 Foxgrape Farm
 Cedar Run
 Spring Branch
 Holly Corner
 Choptank Overlook
 Four Corners
 Three Corners
 Bowen Estates
 Choptank Ponds
 East Cherry
 Kinnamon Meadows (Under Construction)
 Greensboro Farms
 Caroline Farms

Transportation

The primary means of travel to and from Greensboro is by road. The town lies at the junction of three state highways: Maryland Route 313, which travels north-south through the town, Maryland Route 314, which travels east from the town, and Maryland Route 480, which heads southwest from the town.

Notable people
 T. Alan Goldsborough, jurist
William Hersey Hopkins, college administrator

References

External links

 

Towns in Maryland
Towns in Caroline County, Maryland